This article is about the particular significance of the year 1814 to Wales and its people.

Incumbents
Lord Lieutenant of Anglesey – Henry Paget, 1st Marquess of Anglesey 
Lord Lieutenant of Brecknockshire and Monmouthshire – Henry Somerset, 6th Duke of Beaufort
Lord Lieutenant of Caernarvonshire – Thomas Bulkeley, 7th Viscount Bulkeley
Lord Lieutenant of Cardiganshire – Thomas Johnes
Lord Lieutenant of Carmarthenshire – George Rice, 3rd Baron Dynevor 
Lord Lieutenant of Denbighshire – Sir Watkin Williams-Wynn, 5th Baronet    
Lord Lieutenant of Flintshire – Robert Grosvenor, 1st Marquess of Westminster 
Lord Lieutenant of Glamorgan – John Stuart, 1st Marquess of Bute (until 16 November) 
Lord Lieutenant of Merionethshire - Sir Watkin Williams-Wynn, 5th Baronet
Lord Lieutenant of Montgomeryshire – Edward Clive, 1st Earl of Powis
Lord Lieutenant of Pembrokeshire – Richard Philipps, 1st Baron Milford
Lord Lieutenant of Radnorshire – George Rodney, 3rd Baron Rodney

Bishop of Bangor – Henry Majendie 
Bishop of Llandaff – Richard Watson
Bishop of St Asaph – William Cleaver 
Bishop of St Davids – Thomas Burgess

Events
1 January - The first weekly newspaper in Welsh is published, when Seren Gomer is founded by Joseph Harris (Gomer), a Baptist minister in Swansea.
3 January - Lampeter is granted its town charter.
February - Anthony Bushby Bacon sells his mineral rights at Cyfarthfa to Richard Crawshay for £95,000.
May - Caernarvon and Anglesey Hospital is founded.
Summer solstice - Thomas Williams (Gwilym Morgannwg) declaims his poem "Heddwch" from the Logan Stone in the presence of the Gorsedd of Morgannwg, at the "second Assemblage"
10 September - The last recorded fatal duel in Wales is fought at Adpar, Newcastle Emlyn. Thomas Heslop of Jamaica is killed; a local landowner, Beynon, is found guilty and fined one shilling.
date unknown
Sydenham Edwards founds The Botanical Register.
The Admiralty re-locates from Milford Haven to Paterchurch, resulting in the founding of Pembroke Dock.
Journalist and preacher Elijah Waring settles at Neath.

Arts and literature

New books
John Jones - Natur a Chyneddfau Gweddi (2nd edition)

Music
Thomas William - Perl Mewn Adfyd

Births
January - George Grant Francis, philanthropist (d. 1882)
29 January - Edward William Thomas, composer (d. 1892)
5 March - Joseph Edwards, sculptor (d. 1882)
16 June - Robert Davies (Cyndeyrn), composer (d. 1867)
date unknown - Eliezer Pugh, philanthropist (d. 1903)

Deaths
12 March - Evan Thomas (Ieuan Fardd Ddu), printer and translator, 80?
23 April - Richard Jones, clergyman and writer, 57
3 May - Thomas Coke, Methodist leader, 66
21 June - Sir Erasmus Gower, colonial governor, 71
26 September - Owen Jones, antiquary and founder of the Gwyneddigion Society, 73
5 October - Thomas Charles of Bala, Bible publishing pioneer, 58
16 November - John Stuart, 1st Marquess of Bute, 70

References

 Wales